A number of motor vessels were named Kollbjørg, including
, a Norwegian tanker in service 1937–43
, a Norwegian tanker in service 1946–56
, a Norwegian cargo ship in service until at least 1965

Ship names